Demir Hotić (born 9 July 1962) is a Bosnian retired professional footballer and former manager.

Playing career 
His most successful period was while he was playing in 1. FC Kaiserslautern, but he also played for SG Union Solingen, Stuttgarter Kickers and VfB Stuttgart in Germany, Fenerbahçe in Turkey and Yverdon-Sport FC in Switzerland.

Managerial career 
After finishing his playing career, he started managing in Germany where he first spent two seasons with Wormatia Worms. 
Next, he was managing 1. FC Kaiserslautern's youth team, Eintracht Bad Kreuznach, TuRu Düsseldorf and had a short spell as assistant manager at Turkish Gençlerbirliği S.K.

He became manager of Željezničar on 30 December 2008. He stayed there only half a season and was replaced in the summer of 2009 by Amar Osim.

After Željezničar Hotić also managed Velež Mostar in 2010, Borussia Neunkirchen from December 2011 to February 2012 and Vfl 07 Neustadt from January 2014 to December 2014.

Honours

Player
Stuttgarter Kickers 
2. Bundesliga: 1988–89

Kaiserslautern 
Bundesliga: 1990–91
DFB-Pokal: 1989–90

References

External links

Demir Hotić at TFF

1962 births
Living people
People from Novi Grad, Bosnia and Herzegovina
Association football forwards
Yugoslav footballers
Bosnia and Herzegovina footballers
Fortuna Düsseldorf players
SG Union Solingen players
Stuttgarter Kickers players
VfB Stuttgart players
1. FC Kaiserslautern players
Fenerbahçe S.K. footballers
Yverdon-Sport FC players
Bundesliga players
2. Bundesliga players
Süper Lig players
Swiss Challenge League players
Yugoslav expatriate footballers
Expatriate footballers in West Germany
Expatriate footballers in Germany
Yugoslav expatriate sportspeople in Germany
Bosnia and Herzegovina expatriate footballers
Bosnia and Herzegovina expatriate sportspeople in Germany
Expatriate footballers in Switzerland
Bosnia and Herzegovina expatriate sportspeople in Switzerland
Expatriate footballers in Turkey
Bosnia and Herzegovina expatriate sportspeople in Turkey
Bosnia and Herzegovina football managers
Wormatia Worms managers
TuRU Düsseldorf managers
FK Željezničar Sarajevo managers
FK Velež Mostar managers
Borussia Neunkirchen managers
Premier League of Bosnia and Herzegovina managers
Bosnia and Herzegovina expatriate football managers
Expatriate football managers in Germany
Yugoslav expatriate sportspeople in West Germany